Maxime Cressy (born May 8, 1997) is a French-American professional tennis player. He has a career-high singles ranking of world No. 31 by the Association of Tennis Professionals (ATP), achieved on August 8, 2022. He has been ranked as high as world No. 117 in doubles, achieved on February 27, 2023. Cressy has won one title on the ATP Tour and three singles titles and two doubles titles on the ATP Challenger Tour. Before 2018, he played for his country of birth, France.

College career
On May 25, 2019, he and Keegan Smith won the 2019 NCAA tennis doubles championship at UCLA.

Professional career

2019–20: Grand Slam debut in doubles and singles and first win

Cressy made his Grand Slam main draw debut at the 2020 US Open as a wildcard entrant where he reached the second round after defeating Jozef Kovalík. He lost in the second round to fourth seed Stefanos Tsitsipas.

2021: Top 150 debut
He qualified for the 2021 Australian Open and reached the second round by defeating Taro Daniel. However, he lost in the second round to sixth seed Alexander Zverev.

After qualifying for the main draw at the 2021 US Open, Cressy won a five-set match with a fifth set tiebreak against ninth seed and two-time US Open semifinalist Pablo Carreño Busta, after coming back from two sets to love down to win in a tiebreak, saving four match points in the process.

Cressy then qualified for the main draw at the 2021 BNP Paribas Open. He defeated Laslo Đere in the first round before falling to 11th seed Diego Schwartzman in 3 sets. Cressy served for the match against Schwartzman in the third set, but could not convert two match points.
He reached the final in the 2021 Challenger Eckental where he lost to German Daniel Masur. As a result he hit a new career-high of world No. 128 on 8 November 2021.

2022: First ATP title, major fourth round, top 35
Cressy started his 2022 season at the first edition of the Melbourne Summer Set 1. Getting past qualifying, he saved two match points in the second round to beat second seed, world No. 26, and compatriot, Reilly Opelka. He defeated Jaume Munar in the quarterfinals to reach the semifinals of an ATP tournament for the first time. He then defeated third seed and world No. 28, Grigor Dimitrov, in the semifinals to reach his first ATP Tour final. He lost in the final to top seed and world No. 6, Rafael Nadal. Despite losing in the final, he reached a career-high of world No. 70 on January 17, 2022. At the Sydney Classic, he reached the quarterfinals where he fell to third seed, world No. 26, and 2017 finalist, Dan Evans. Cressy qualified for direct entry at the Australian Open after the withdrawal of Dominic Thiem. He defeated the 22nd seed, fellow American John Isner in five sets with three tiebreaks in the first round for his second win at this Grand Slam. Cressy advanced to the third round of a Grand Slam for the first time in his career after defeating qualifier Tomáš Macháč in four sets. He then beat Australian wildcard Christopher O'Connell to progress to the fourth round for the first time at any Major. As a result he made his top 60 debut in the rankings at world No. 59 on January 31, 2022. Cressy would lose in the fourth round to second seed Daniil Medvedev.

At the 2022 Eastbourne International he reached his second final after defeating leading British player Jack Draper. En route to the final, he defeated World No. 12 and top seed Cameron Norrie. As a result he moved into the top 50 in the singles rankings.

On his debut at the 2022 Wimbledon Championships, he defeated World No. 9 and sixth seed Félix Auger-Aliassime for his first top-10 win.

He won his first ATP Tour title  at the 2022 Hall of Fame Open in Newport, RI. Seeded fourth, he reached his third final of the season and in his career after defeating second seed John Isner. He would go on to win the title after defeating third seed Alexander Bublik in the final, coming back from a set and a break down. As a result he reached a new career-high of No. 33 on 18 July 2022.

2023: Second top-10 win, ATP singles final & first doubles title & top 75 
Cressy started his 2023 season at the Adelaide International 1. He lost in the first round to Australian wildcard Thanasi Kokkinakis. At the Australian Open, he was defeated in the second round by ninth seed and world No. 10, Holger Rune.

At the 2023 Open Sud de France, he reached both finals in singles defeating seventh seed Emil Ruusuvuori, third seed Borna Ćorić, top-10 player and No. 1 seed Holger Rune, and in doubles partnering Frenchman Albano Olivetti, defeating second seeds Santiago González / Édouard Roger-Vasselin and Sander Arends / David Pel.

He won his first ATP doubles title in Dubai with Fabrice Martin, defeating third seeds Harri Heliövaara and Lloyd Glasspool. As a result he moved 45 positions up into the top 75 in doubles.

Playing style
Cressy is a big server who plays a predominantly serve-and-volley style in his service games. His second serve is nearly as fast as, and sometimes faster than, his first serve. He has an aggressive return of serve. He has a good forehand and backhand but is most dangerous when he is chipping-and-charging and volleying.

Performance timelines

Singles
Current through the 2023 BNP Paribas Open.

Doubles

ATP career finals

Singles: 4 (1 title, 3 runner-ups)

Doubles: 2 (1 title, 1 runner-up)

ATP Challenger and ITF Futures finals

Singles: 11 (5 titles, 6 runner-ups)

Doubles: 14 (13 titles, 1 runner-ups)

Record against top-10 players

Cressy's record against those who have been ranked in the top 10, with active players in boldface.

Wins over top 10 players
Cressy has a  record against players who were, at the time the match was played, ranked in the top 10.

References

External links

 
 

1997 births
Living people
American male tennis players
French emigrants to the United States
Tennis players from Paris
People from Hermosa Beach, California
UCLA Bruins men's tennis players
French male tennis players